A diceless role-playing game is a role-playing game which is not based on chance: it does not use randomisers to determine the outcome of events in its role-playing game system. The style of game is known as "diceless" because most games use dice as their randomiser; some games such as Castle Falkenstein use other randomisers such as playing cards as substitutes for dice, and are not considered "diceless".

One commentator described the introduction of diceless RPGs in 1991, They went "diceless," creating a rules system where everything was worked out by the Game Master via numerical comparisons and other (non-random) techniques. Amber Diceless (Phage Press) created quite a stir, and the great diceless debate had begun in full force. A debate that, ultimately, the dice fans would apparently win, at least in the marketplace.

Proponents of this solution argue that in all game systems, decisions are ultimately made by the GM, and rolling dice merely slows gameplay. Opponents may perceive diceless systems as more arbitrary and lacking the feeling of real unpredictability; for example, the potential death of a character as a result of bad luck in a die roll.

Examples of diceless games

Randomizers without Dice
 Everway uses diceless mechanics, but also has elements of chance through Fortune Deck, if the game master wishes to utilize them.
 Fate of the Norns is a Viking RPG set during the dark age of Ragnarok. It uses the Futhark rune set to resolve all game mechanics.
 Dread (role-playing game) uses a Jenga tower or similar to determine the success of actions.
 Frankenstein Atomic Frontier, an Australian role-playing game, uses cards with players drawing a quantity equal to their trait, counting Aces, Kings, Queens, Jacks and Jokers as a success.

Non Probabilistic
 Active Exploits a diceless set of role-playing game rules by Precis Intermedia Gaming. .
 Amber Diceless Roleplaying Game uses no randomization, although secret information does create uncertainty for players.
 Chuubo's Marvelous Wish-Granting Engine by Jenna Moran is a slice-of-life game as well as an adventure game.
 Golden Sky Stories, a Japanese heartwarming, non-violent role-playing game, uses resource pools, called Wonder and Feelings, rather than dice. 
 Lords of Gossamer and Shadow uses no randomization, but has Good Stuff and Bad Stuff to influence circumstances of chance.
 Lords of Olympus is inspired by Amber Diceless in which players take roles of Greek pantheon characters.
 Mannerism uses a weighted rock, paper, scissors like interaction between a player's description and the GM's intended complication so that expected hazardous outcomes can be avoided.  
 Marvel Universe Roleplaying Game uses a resource-management system inspired by collectible card games.
 Microscope and Kingdom use diceless mechanics to create a setting.
 Montsegur 1244 is a game about the fall of Monstsegur Castle, held by the Cathars. The plot is pre-scripted and leads to the question which of the characters burn for heresy, and does one of them escape into the night?
 Nobilis by Jenna Moran. 
 Stalker is the official adaptation of Arkady and Boris Strugatsky's Roadside Picnic.
 Sufficiently Advanced, Second Edition, is a transhumanist sci-fi game that does not use randomization.
 Theatrix (role-playing game)
 Troika Moira uses secrecy to replicate chance for most actions and a double-bluff system for combat, similar to rock, paper, scissors.

References

Role-playing game terminology